Furkat Saidov (born 1 January 1987) is a Uzbekistani weightlifter. He competed in the men's middle heavyweight event at the 2004 Summer Olympics.

References

1987 births
Living people
Uzbekistani male weightlifters
Olympic weightlifters of Uzbekistan
Weightlifters at the 2004 Summer Olympics
Place of birth missing (living people)
21st-century Uzbekistani people